BNH may refer to:

BNH Hospital, a hospital in Bangkok, Thailand
Bahrain National Holding BSC, a public holding company based in Manama
BNH, the Jakarta MRT station code for Bendungan Hilir MRT station, Jakarta, Indonesia
BNH, the National Rail station code for Barnehurst railway station, London, England.
BNH, the football stadium code for Back National Hospital, Colorado, U.S.A.